Hanumant Moreshwar Marathe (2 March 1940 – 2 October 2017) (Mr: ह. मो. मराठे), was a journalist and Marathi writer. He was also known by the name 'Ha Mo’ in literary circles.

Early life
He was born on 2 March 1940 at Zolambe, a small village in the Konkan region of Maharashtra. His father was ill due to schizophrenia and his mother was also not well. His elder brother Babal took his responsibility. He started his career with teaching at a college in Kolhapur.

Career
During his illustrious career, he also worked in newspapers and magazines in various capacities, including as an editor. He also worked in Tarun Bharat and Kirloskar magazine. He also did writing in magazines like Lokprabha, Ghardar, Marmik, Navshkati. In 1956, his first write up was published in Saptahik Janayug.

His novel "Kaleshar Pani" was very much controversial due to its content. The matter had gone to court in 1973.

Books
 Nishparna Vrikshavar Bhar Dupari निष्पर्ण वृक्षावर भर दुपारी
 Kaleshar Pani काळेशार पाणी
 Annanchi Topi (short stories compilation)
 Baalkand बालकांड
 News Story न्यूजस्टोरी
 Kaliyug कलियुग 
 Pakshini पक्षिणी 
 Itivrutta इतिवृत्त 
 Market मार्केट
 Software सॉफ्टवेअर
 Haddapar हद्दपार

Short stories/articles
 Annanchi topi अण्णांची टोपी (कथासंग्रह)
 Ajjchi nyika आजची नायिका (उपरोधिक)
 Itihasatil ek pan इतिहासातील एक अज्ञात दिवस (कथासंग्रह)
 Ulta aarsa उलटा आरसा (उपरोधिक)
 Ek manus ek diwas एक माणूस एक दिवस (भाग १ ते ३)
 Ghoda घोडा
 Yuddha युद्ध
 Jwalamukh ज्वालामुख
 Target टार्गेट 
 Chunav ramayan चुनाव रामायण (व्यंगकथा)
 Jwalamukh ज्वालामुख (कथासंग्रह)
 The big boss द बिग बॉस (व्यंगकथा)
 Dinman दिनमान (उपरोधिक लेख)
 Devachi ghanta देवाची घंटा
 N lihilele Vishay न लिहिलेले विषय (वैचारिक)
 Pahila chaha पहिला चहा (भाग १, २)
 Pohra पोहरा (आत्मकथा; ’बालकांड’चा २रा भाग)
 Prastavik प्रास्ताविक
 Balkand बालकांड (आत्मकथेचा १ला भाग; दुसरा भाग – पोहरा)
 Bankand and Pohra बालकाण्ड आणि पोहरा : समीक्षा आणि समांतर समीक्षा (संपादक आणि प्रकाशक – ह.मो. मराठे)
 Madle pan मधलं पान (लेखसंग्रह)
 Mumbaiche undir मुंबईचे उंदीर (व्यंगकथा)
 Madhurichya daratil ghoda माधुरीच्या दारातील घोडा (व्यंगकथा)
 Yuddha युद्ध
 Lava लावा (हिंदी)
 Veej वीज (बाल साहित्य)
 Shrimant Shymachi aaiश्रीमंत श्यामची आई (व्यंगकथा)
 Swargsukhache package स्वर्गसुखाचे package (विनोदी)
 Haddapar हद्दपार
 Aadhi rokhlya banduka aata ugarlya talwari आधी रोखल्या बंदुका आता उगारल्या तलवारी
 Gandh, shendi, janve ani bhrahman chalval गंध, शेंडी, जानवे आणि ब्राह्मण चळवळ
 Brahman chalaval kashasathi ब्राह्मण चळवळ कशासाठी?
 Brahmannidechi navi laat ब्राह्मणनिंदेची नवी लाट
 Brahmanmanas ब्राह्मणमानस
 Brahmhnanna aankhi kiti zodnar? ब्राह्मणांना आणखी किती झोडपणार? (२००४)
 Vidrohi brahmanविद्रोही ब्राह्मण
 Shivdharm शिवधर्म ... 
 Sant tukaramancha khun kharikharich brahmananni kela asel ka? संत तुकारामांचा खून खरोखरीच ब्राह्मणांनी केला असेल का?

The play Don Special (दोन स्पेशल) was based on his novel News Story.

Death
HM Marathe passed away following a prolonged illness on 2 October 2017. He was 77. He died at Deenanath Mangeshkar Hospital in Pune where he was undergoing heart-related treatment and had difficulty in breathing.

References

1940 births
2017 deaths
Indian editors
20th-century Indian journalists
Journalists from Maharashtra